Jayde may refer to:

First name or given name
Jayde Adams (born 1984), British comedian
Jayde Herrick (born 1985), Australian cricketer
Jayde Kruger (born 1988) South African racing driver
Jayde Nicole (born 1986), Canadian model
Jayde Taylor (born 1985), Australian field hockey player

Surname
Negrita Jayde (1958–2009), Canadian female bodybuilding champion, personal trainer, author, actor and businesswoman

See also
This Is Jayde: The One Hit Wonder, 2014 British comedy film
Jayded, or Jayded Records, record label founded by Jay Sean